Sítio do Picapau Amarelo (Portuguese title: Pirlimpimpim) is a Brazilian children's television series, based on the work of Monteiro Lobato, adapted by Márcio Trigo and Roberto Talma. It was the fifth television adaptation of the work, after the first version shown by Rede Tupi between 1952 and 1963, the second version shown by TV Cultura in 1964, the third version shown by Band between 1967 and 1969 and the fourth version shown by Globo itself between 1977 and 1986.

It was produced and shown by TV Globo from 2001 to 2007, After its original airing on TV Globo, the first 4 seasons of the series were aired by Futura channel from 8 December 2008, the series was also aired by Viva and TV Cultura channel in 2013.

Reruns 
The series began to be rerun by Canal Futura from 8 December 2008, but the channel only aired the episodes of the first four seasons of the series, except for the last episode of the fourth season "O Pequeno Samurai" with only half of the episode, due to the following seasons being formatted as a telenovela and the episode "O Pequeno Samurai" being considered inadequate and too strong for the channel's educational standard. For some reason, the seventh and final season, which is not in the soap opera format, was never released by Rede Globo. The series was also aired on the subscription channel Gloob, which managed to release all seasons, but the show only aired until the fourth season, and after some time took the series off its schedule, before airing the last few seasons. It was also shown by Canal Viva, and by TV Cultura from 30 August 2013 to 27 June 2014, until it went off the air because of the return of the series Castelo Rá-Tim-Bum on the channel's programming from 30 August 2014. June. It was aired again by the same station on 10 January 2015, on Saturdays at 6:30 pm. It is also shown internationally with its original audio by TV Globo Internacional, and has also been shown in Portugal by SIC that aired until the fifth season, but with the title of Pirlimpimpim, which did not have much repercussion and soon went off the air.

Synopsis 
The series exhibited several stories based on Brazilian folklore, always with characters such as Cuca, Saci Pererê, Iara. 
The residents of Sítio, Emília, Narizinho, Pedrinho, Dona Benta and Tia Nastacia lived several adventures, a lot of mystery and dangers that haunted the remote town of Arraial do Tucanos.

Cast and characters

Main 
 Isabelle Drummond as Emília (2001–2006)
 Tatyane Goulart as Emília (2007)
 Lara Rodrigues as Narizinho (2001–2003); Samira Elias (2006)
 Caroline Molinari as Narizinho (2004–2005)
 Amanda Diniz as Narizinho (2006)
 César Cardadeiro as Pedrinho (2001–2003)
 João Vítor Silva as Pedrinho (2004–2005); Caipora (2006)
 Rodolfo Valente as Pedrinho (2006)
 Nicette Bruno as Dona Benta (2001–2004)
 Suely Franco as Dona Benta (2005–2006)
 Bete Mendes as Dona Benta (2007)
 Dhu Moraes as Tia Nastacia (2001–2006)
 João Acaiabe as Tio Barnabé (2001–2006)
 Gésio Amadeu as Tio Barnabé (2007)
 Ary Fontoura as Coronel Teodorico de Menezes (2001–2005)
 Izak Dahora as Saci (2001–2006)
 Cândido Damm as Visconde de Sabugosa (2001–2004)
 Aramis Trindade as Visconde de Sabugosa (2005–2006)
 Kiko Mascarenhas as Visconde de Sabugosa (2007)
 Zé Clayton as Conselheiro
 Sidney Beckencamp as Quindim	
 Jacira Santos (body)/Mônica Rossi (voice) as Cuca (2001–2006)

Recurring 
 Yachmin Gazal as Antonica
 Isaac Bardavid as Miguelito (2001); Elias (2006)
 Edson Celulari as Dom Quixote (2001)
 Deborah Evelyn as Astrônoma (2001)
 Deborah Secco as Herself (2001)
 Tony Ramos as Himself (2001)
 Isabela Garcia as Mrs. Merenguita (2001)
 Maurício Mattar as Tupã (2001)
 Herson Capri as São Jorge (2001)
 Carlos Vereza as Dr. Austregésio (2001); Trovoada (2002)
 Malu Mader as Herself disguise by Cuca (2001)
 Reynaldo Gianecchini as Himself (2001)
 Ivete Sangalo as Cassia (2001)
 Murilo Rosa as Himself (2001)
 Bruno Gagliasso as Romildo / Romeu (2002)
 Antônio Calloni as Conde Xis Parmesan (2002)
 Zezé Polessa as Aranha Secretária (2002)
 Fernanda Rodrigues as Cinderela (2002)
 Maria Maya as Tonica Ventania (2002)
 Maria Luísa Mendonça as Palas Atena; Flora (2002)
 Bruna Marquezine as Broken Wing Angel (2002); Jajale / Marina (2004)
 Lília Cabral as Hera (2002)
 Danielle Winits as Drª. Jaqueline / Cuca (2002)
 Márcio Garcia as Príncipe Rajá Codadade (2002)
 Eva Todor as Maria José (Mazé) (2002)
 Ana Maria Braga as Herself (2002)
 Juliana Paes as Jurema (2002)
 Ney Latorraca as Baron Munchausen (2002)
 Nizo Neto as Nestor / Frankeinstein (2002–2005)
 Susana Werner as Sereia Serena (2002)
 Humberto Martins as Long John Silver (2002)
 Thiago Lacerda as Hans Staden (2002)
 Angélica as Herself disguise by Cuca (2002)
 Helena Fernandes as Evil Queen (2002)
 Leandra Leal as Wallet Disguised By Cuca (2002); Guinevere (2003)
 Guilherme Leme as Hermes (2002)
 Marilu Bueno as Dona Carochinha (2003-2005)
 Carla Diaz as Cléo (2003)
 Carla Marins as Headless Mule / Berta (2003)
 Alessandra Negrini as Rapunzel (2003)
 Luana Piovani as Morgana (2003)
 Leticia Spiller as Gravita (2003)
 Cássio Gabus Mendes as Nicanor (2003)
 Cláudia Raia as Medéia (2003)
 Arlete Salles as Hermengarda (2003)
 Paulo Goulart as Bartolomeu Bueno da Silva (2003)
 Norton Nascimento as Maldoror (2003)
 Guilherme Karan as Anibal (2003)
 Luiz Carlos Tourinho Mefisto (2003)
 Lima Duarte as João Melado (2003)
 Priscila Fantin as Bela (2003)
 Luigi Baricelli as Fera (2003)
 Fernanda Paes Leme as Clarice (2003)
 Márcia Cabrita as Dulce (2003); Estelita (2005); Cacá (Cuca)
 Supla as Elvis McCartney (2004)
 Rita Guedes as Amorzinho (2004)
 Flávia Alessandra as Branca Flor (2004)
 Marcelo Serrado as Polidoro (2004)
 Wanessa Camargo as Diana Dechamps (2004)
 Lupe Gigliotti as Dona Joaninha (2004–2005)
 Thávyne Ferrari as Patty Pop (2005); Flora Caipora (2006)
 Chico Anysio as Dr. SaraIva (2005)
 Lu Grimaldi as Marcela (2005)
 Thiago Fragoso as Rabicó Humano (2005)
 Bel Kutner as Flor (2006)
 Thiago de Los Reyes as Príncipe Theo (2006)
 Flávio Migliaccio as Iaú (2004); Eremita (2006)
 Dirce Migliaccio as Mãe de Valdo (2006)
 Lidi Lisboa as Jurema (2006)
 Sophie Charlotte as Cinderela (2006)
 Nelson Xavier as Barão de Tremembé (2007)
 Humberto Carrão as Caipora (2007)
 Aglido Ribeiro as Coronel Teotônico (2007)
 Paulo Gustavo as Delegado Lupicínio (2007)
 Mateus Solano as Pop Man (2007)
 Duse Nacaratti as Velha Firinfiféia (2007)

Production 
Years after the end of the contract between Monteiro Lobato's heirs and Rede Globo, for the production of the series in the 70s and 80s of Sítio do Picapau Amarelo, in 1999 Cíntia Abravanel, daughter of television presenter Silvio Santos, intended to get the rights for a new adaptation of the works of Monteiro Lobato on SBT, his father's network. However, Silvio Santos showed no interest in the idea, and the rights then returned to Rede Globo.

Globo, in turn, began to produce a new adaptation of the Sítio in July 2000 and on 12 October 2001 started to show it in the children's program Bambuluá, in a special edition for Children's Day. Finally, from 22 December 2001, the Sítio was shown separately.

Seasons

Soundtrack

Sítio do Picapau Amarelo (2001 album)

Sítio do Picapau Amarelo is the soundtrack of the Brazilian television series of the same name. The album was released in 2001 by the Som Livre record company, which carries the soundtrack of the series with songs already known to the general public, as most of the songs are re-recordings of the songs from the first version of Sítio do Picapau Amarelo (such as Sítio do Picapau Amarelo & Vol. 2 from 1977 to 1979) made by Rede Globo in the 70s, featuring only 5 new songs, was released at the end of 2001 along with a VHS of the first episode of the series "Reino das Águas Claras".

Sítio do Picapau Amarelo (2005 album)

Sítio do Picapau Amarelo is the soundtrack for the 5th season of the Brazilian television series of the same name. It was released in 2005 by the Som Livre record company in CD format.

Sítio do Picapau Amarelo (2006 album)

Sítio do Picapau Amarelo is the last soundtrack of the 6th season of the Brazilian television series of the same name. The album was released in 2006 by Som Livre on CD, which contains 12 songs by the characters and 13 instrumental songs.

References

External links
 Sítio do Picapau Amarelo – 2a Versão
 

TV Globo
Rede Globo original programming
2001 Brazilian television series debuts
2007 Brazilian television series endings
2000s Brazilian television series
Brazilian children's television series
Portuguese-language television shows